In finance, option on realized volatility (or volatility option) is a subclass of derivatives securities that the payoff function embedded with the notion of annualized realized volatility of a specified underlying asset, which could be stock index, bond, foreign exchange rate, etc. Another product of volatility derivative that is widely traded refers to the volatility swap, which is in another word the forward contract on future realized volatility.

The long position of the volatility option, like the vanilla option, has the right but not the obligation to trade the annualized realized volatility interchange with the short position at some agreed price (volatility strike) at some predetermined point in the future (expiry date). The payoff is commonly settled in cash by some notional amount. What distinguishes this financial contract from ordinary options is that the risk measure is irrespective of the asset returns but belongs purely to the price volatility. As a result, traders can use it as a tool to speculate on price volatility movements in order to hedge their portfolio positions without taking a directional risk by holding the underlying asset.

Definitions

Realized volatility
In practice, the annualized realized volatility is interpreted in discrete sampling by the squared root of the annualized realized variance. Namely, if there are  sampling points of the underlying prices, says  observed at time  where  for all , then the annualized realized variance is valued by

 

where 

 is the options expiry date which is equal to the number 

By this setting we then have  specified as an annualized realized volatility.

In addition, once the observation number  increases to infinity, the discretely defined realized volatility converges in probability to the squared root of the underlying asset quadratic variation i.e.

 

which eventually defines the continuous sampling version of the realized volatility. One might find, to some extent, it is more convenient to use this notation to price volatility derivatives. However, the solution is only the approximation form of the discrete one since the contract is normally quoted in discrete sampling.

Volatility option payoffs
If we set 

 to be a volatility strike and

 be a notional amount of the option in a money unit, says, USD or GBP per annualized volatility point,

 

and 

respectively, where  if the realized volatility is discretely sampled and  if it is of the continuous sampling. And to perceive their present values, it suffices only to compute one of them since the other is simultaneously obtained by the auxiliary of put-call parity.

Pricing and valuation

Concerning the no arbitrage argument, suppose that the underlying asset price  is modelled under a risk-neutral probability  and solves the following time-varying Black-Schloes equation:

 

where:
 is (time-varying) risk-free interest rate,
 is (time-varying) price volatility, and

Then the fair price of variance call at time  denoted by  can be obtained by

where  represents a conditional expectation of random variable  with respect to  under the risk-neutral probability .

See also
Volatility swap
Variance swap
Option on realized variance
Volatility (finance)

References

Derivatives (finance)
options (finance)
Statistical deviation and dispersion